Natolin is a residential neighborhood in Ursynów, the southernmost district of Warsaw.

Natolin may also refer to the following villages:
Natolin, Łódź Voivodeship (central Poland)
Natolin, Grodzisk Mazowiecki County in Masovian Voivodeship (east-central Poland)
Natolin, Mińsk County in Masovian Voivodeship (east-central Poland)
Natolin, Otwock County in Masovian Voivodeship (east-central Poland)
Natolin, Sokołów County in Masovian Voivodeship (east-central Poland)
Natolin, Węgrów County in Masovian Voivodeship (east-central Poland)
Natolin, Radom County in Masovian Voivodeship (east-central Poland)
Natolin, Silesian Voivodeship (south Poland)

See also
Natolin Park